Masquerade Ridge is a prominent rock ridge,  long, located  north of Clarkson Peak on the east side of Robb Glacier, Antarctica. Rocks were collected here by John Gunner and John Splettstoesser in December 1969. The name was suggested by Gunner because the ridge is pictured on the cover of the February 7, 1970 issue of Saturday Review, in which an article about the 1969–70 Ohio State University Geological Expedition to the general area appears. The ridge on the photograph was evidently confused with Coalsack Bluff, and the individual in the foreground of the photograph is not David Elliot, as the caption states.

References

Ridges of the Ross Dependency
Shackleton Coast